Velden may refer to several places:

Velden am Wörther See, a municipality on lake Wörthersee in Carinthia, Austria
Velden, Limburg, a village in the municipality of Venlo, Netherlands
Velden (Pegnitz), a town in the district of Nürnberger Land in Bavaria, Germany
Velden (Vils), a municipality in the district of Landshut in southeastern Bavaria, Germany